Sigma Omicron Pi is an Asian American interest sorority. Founded in 1930 at San Francisco State University, the college social organization has active chapters on twelve campuses in the United States. The stated objective of the sorority is to "further the awareness of women in Asian culture" and "to promote unity, lifelong friendships, leadership, and community service".

History
In 1930, ten Asian American women came together on the campus of San Francisco State University to form a sorority for women who were interested in teaching. They adopted the Greek letters ΣΟΠ or Sigma Omicron Pi to represent "Sisters of Pedagogy". It was the first Chinese sorority on that campus. Elizabeth Ling-so Hall was a founder and the sorority's first president. 

Sigma Omicron Pi expanded to the University of California, Berkeley campus in 1936. The sorority became active in the Asian community. Annually, they held a fashion show to raise scholarship money with the UC Chinese Alumni Association.

However, both chapters were forced to become inactive during World War II. Sigma Omicron Pi was revived at the University of California, Berkeley in 1946. The educational focus fell away, changing to providing fellowship, philanthropy, and cultural awareness for and among Asian American women of many Asian backgrounds.

In 1994, the sorority created an Inter-Chapter Council with six elected officers to help unite the various chapters.

Symbols 
The sororities colors are green and gold. Its flower is the daisy and its jewel is the pearl.

Chapters
Active chapters are in bold. Inactive chapters are in italics.

Notes

Notable alumni

Tiffany Lam – Miss Hong Kong 2002, Miss Chinese International 2003 runner up, and TVB actress

References

Student societies in the United States
Asian-American culture in San Francisco
Asian-American fraternities and sororities
Student organizations established in 1930
1930 establishments in California